Burslem is a town in Stoke-on-Trent, Staffordshire.

Burslem may also refer to:

People 
 Alexandra Burslem (born 1940), British academic and educationalist
 Henry Burslem (1790–1866)
 Nathaniel Burslem (1837–1865), war hero
 Oliver Burslem

Other uses 
 Burslem (UK Parliament constituency)
 "Burslem Normals", a song by Robbie Williams